The National Intercollegiate Soccer Officials Association (NISOA) is the organization responsible for improving the quality of officiating at college soccer matches in the United States.

External links
http://www.nisoa.com

Soccer governing bodies in the United States